Rita Rae, Lady Rae (born 20 June 1950) is a Scottish lawyer, judge and a former Senator of the College of Justice.

Career
She became a solicitor in 1974. She joined the Faculty of Advocates from 1982 and was appointed a Queen's Counsel in 1992. From 2003 to 2006 she was a member of the Sentencing Commission for Scotland.

Rae served as a temporary sheriff from 1987–1997.  She was appointed a sheriff at Glasgow in 1997.  She became temporary judge at the Court of Session in 2004. From 2001–2007 she was a member (and vice-chair from 2005) of the Parole Board for Scotland.

Rae was appointed as a permanent judge (a Lord Ordinary) of the Court of Session and a Judge of the Supreme Courts in January 2014.

In 2015, Lady Rae presided over the trial of Alexander Pacteau after he pled guilty to the murder of Karen Buckley in Glasgow. She retired in June 2020.

On 21 April 2021, Rae was elected Rector of the University of Glasgow, succeeding Aamer Anwar.

References

1950 births
Living people
Senators of the College of Justice
Scottish solicitors
Members of the Faculty of Advocates
Scottish women judges
Scottish King's Counsel
20th-century King's Counsel
Scottish sheriffs
Women sheriffs
Rectors of the University of Glasgow